Long Ambients 2 (printed as Long Ambients Two on the cover)  is the sixteenth studio album by American electronic musician, songwriter, and producer Moby, released on March 15, 2019. It is the sequel to his previous ambient album, Long Ambients 1: Calm. Sleep. (2016), which also consist the long-hour of ambient music.

Background
Long Ambients 2 is the follow-up to Long Ambients 1: Calm. Sleep. (2016) and offers more than 200 minutes of ambient music to put a listener to sleep or to meditate. Moby had struggled to find music that helped him sleep better, so he decided to compose some himself. He intended the music to also help people calm down, reduce anxiety, and aid in their own sleep issues. "LA15" is an extended version/remix of "LA8" from Long Ambients 1, while "LA16" is an extended version of "LA10". The other four pieces are entirely new to this album. Moby explained, "Most of the music in my life I’ve made with an audience in mind, but this long ambient music I originally just made for myself."

Release
The album was released on March 15, 2019 to commemorate World Sleep Day. It was available exclusively on Calm, a meditation app, for the first thirty days before it was released on other streaming and music download platforms.

Track listing

Chart performance

See also
 Sleep, album by Max Richter created to fit a full night's sleep

References

External links

2019 albums
Moby albums
Ambient albums by American artists
Albums free for download by copyright owner
Self-released albums
Sleep
Sequel albums